T Siddalingaya  (1898 – 23 July 1984) was a politician from Indian State of Mysore (now Karnataka).

He represented Mysore State in Rajya Sabha, the Council of States of India parliament during 1967 to 1970. Earlier he was member of Mysore Legislative Council during 1947–1950, minister in Govt. of Mysore during 1952–1953 and member of Constituent Assembly of India.

He was survived by his wife Parvatamma, 2 sons and 1 daughter.

References

1898 births
1984 deaths
Rajya Sabha members from Karnataka
Members of the Constituent Assembly of India
Mysore State
Indian National Congress politicians from Karnataka